In the history of German humour, whisper jokes were jokes that could not be told in public, because they addressed taboo subjects, for instance criticizing authorities.

Nazi Germany
Whisper jokes spread in Nazi Germany under Adolf Hitler, and served different purposes. Inside Germany, the jokes voiced criticism against the totalitarian regime, which would otherwise have been subject to persecution. They could thus be seen as a form of resistance. In the occupied areas, and especially in the Nazi ghettos, whisper jokes can be interpreted as a survival mechanism.

The following is an example of a whisper joke in Nazi Germany, parodied from the children's prayer: "Dear God, make me good / so I can go to heaven" (Lieber Gott, mach mich fromm / Daß ich in den Himmel komm), rephrased as "Dear God, make me dumb / so I don't come to Dachau" (Lieber Gott, mach mich stumm / Daß ich nicht in Dachau kumm).

There have been quite a few whisper jokes about Adolf Hitler: Hitler is visiting an asylum. The patients lined up by their beds greet him with "Heil Hitler!". Only one man stands aside and does not greet. Hitler gets angry and asks him why. He answers: "I'm not crazy, I am the head of the ward." In 1944 a person was executed for the following one: Hitler and Göring are standing on the Berlin Radio Tower. Hitler tells Göring he wants to do something to cheer up the people of Berlin. “Why don’t you just jump?” Göring suggests.

Joseph Goebbels' Sportpalast speech  lead to the spread of a late-war whisper joke, popular in the western part of Germany, especially the Ruhr:

During the war, there were a number of jokes related to the war, eg.:

 Someone from Essen and someone from Berlin talk about the damage done by allied bombing campaigns. Says the guy from Berlin: The last bombing run on the capital was so serious, the window panes kept falling out until five hours after the raid. The guy from Essen replies: That's nothing! After the last bombing run, pictures of the Führer kept flying out of the windows for fourteen days!

 German Christmas 1943: The English throw Christmas trees (German expression for target marker flares), the flak (anti-aircraft gun) contributes "Christmas tree balls" (in German: "Kugel" can be both, also a bullet), Göring donates tinsel, Goebbels tells Christmas stories ("Märchen" = fairy tales), and the German people light candles in the basement and await the gift giving ("Bescherung" = gift giving, but also "mess") descending from above.

Late in the war the following whisper jokes circulated: 
 Time is flying. A thousand years are already over ... (mocking the term "thousand-year Reich")
 Which city has the most warehouses? Berlin: Wherever you look, there were houses ... (In the center of Berlin, more than 50% of the apartments had been destroyed or severely damaged by the end of the war.) - This is a pun with the two German words "Waren" (goods, wares) and "waren" (there/they were).
 Soldiers of the Volkssturm are now being sent to the front in pairs. One throws a stone, and the other one shouts "boom!".

GDR

In the GDR, whisper jokes ridiculed the Communist party and the state-run elections, or the living conditions in the Communist state. Below is the example of a joke featuring the General Secretary Erich Honecker, a variant from the 2006 Oscar-winning movie The Lives of Others:
Early in the morning, Erich Honecker arrives at his office and opens his window. He greets the Sun, saying: "Good morning, dear Sun!", and the sun replies: "Good morning, dear Erich!"  At noon Honecker heads to the window and says: "Good day, dear Sun!" — "Good day, dear Erich!" In the evening, Erich  heads once more to the window, and says: "Good evening, dear Sun!" Hearing nothing, Honecker says again: "Good evening, dear Sun! What's the matter?" The sun retorts: "Kiss my arse. I'm in the West now!"

References 
Citations

Sources
 Rudi Hartmann (1983), Flüsterwitze aus dem Tausendjährigen Reich (Whispered Jokes from the Thousand Year Reich), Knaur, Google Books, snippet.
  "DDR-Witze, oder Der Sozialismus siecht!" in German. (GDR Jokes, or Socialism is sickening!), Klartextsatire.de
  "DDR-Humor Darüber lachte der Osten" in German. Mz-web.de, 2017.
 Gramm, H.-J. (1964), Der Flüsterwitz im Dritten Reich, München (List). 
 Bos, D. & Hart, M. (2008), Humour and Social Protest, Cambridge (CUP).

External links 
 

German humour
Joke cycles